Hello Ninja is an animated children's streaming television series based on the book of the same name by N.D. Wilson airing on Netflix.

The show premiered on November 1, 2019. Its second season was released on April 24, 2020. The third season was released on September 6, 2020. A fourth season was released on January 19, 2021.

Premise
Hello Ninja revolves around Wesley (Lukas Engel), his best friend Georgie (Zoey Siewert) & his orange cat Pretzel. Wesley's super-wise grandma, Baa-Chan (AKA Kuma the Dragon) (Mayumi Yoshida), teaches them life lessons that all "ninjas" should learn.

Cast
 Lukas Engel as Wesley
 Zoey Siewert as Georgie
 Sam Vincent as Pretzel
 Mayumi Yoshida as Baa-Chang
 Shannon Chan-Kent as Mom
 Vincent Tong as Dad
 Mayumi Yoshida as Gen
 Travis Turner as Zeke

Episodes

Season 1 (2019)

Season 2 (2020)

Season 3 (2020)

Season 4 (2021)

Production
On July 22, 2019 Netflix announced that it had given a greenlight production order to Hello Ninja with Mark Palmer on board as showrunner, Susan Kim as story editor and Michael Dowding as the director.

Release
Hello Ninja was released on November 1, 2019 on Netflix. Season 2 was released on April 24, 2020. On May 18, 2020 it was announced the series had been renewed for a third season which released September 6, 2020. On July 10, 2020 it was announced the series had been renewed for a fourth season which released on January 19, 2021.

References

External links
 
 

2010s American animated television series
2020s American animated television series
2010s American children's television series
2020s American children's television series
2010s Canadian animated television series
2020s Canadian animated television series
2010s Canadian children's television series
2020s Canadian children's television series
2010s preschool education television series
2020s preschool education television series
2019 American television series debuts
2019 Canadian television series debuts
2021 American television series endings
2021 Canadian television series endings
American children's animated action television series
American children's animated adventure television series
American computer-animated television series
American preschool education television series
Animated preschool education television series
Animated television series about cats
Animated television series about children
Anime-influenced Western animated television series
Canadian children's animated action television series
Canadian children's animated adventure television series
Canadian computer-animated television series
Canadian preschool education television series
English-language Netflix original programming
Netflix children's programming
Animated television series by Netflix